The Ministry of Labour and Social Protection of the Russian Federation is a ministry of the Government of Russia responsible for social protection and labor. 

The Ministry of Labour and Social Protection was formed in 2012 under Prime Minister Dmitry Medvedev when the former Ministry of Health and Social Development was split in two, with the health departments forming the Ministry of Health. It is headquartered at the Buildings of the Northern Insurance Company in Tverskoy District, Moscow.

Anton Kotyakov has served as the Minister of Labour and Social Protection since 21 January 2020.

External links
 

Organizations based in Moscow
Labour and Social Protection